Euphaedra dargeana, or Darge's Ceres forester, is a butterfly in the family Nymphalidae. It is found in Nigeria, Cameroon, Gabon and possibly the northern part of the Democratic Republic of the Congo. The habitat consists of forests.

References

Butterflies described in 1980
dargeana